The 2020 United States House of Representatives election in Montana was held on November 3, 2020, to elect the U.S. representative from Montana's at-large congressional district. The election coincided with the 2020 U.S. presidential election, as well as other elections to the House of Representatives, elections to the United States Senate and various state and local elections.

The incumbent, Republican Greg Gianforte, who was reelected with 50.9% of the vote in 2018, declined to run for reelection and instead ran successfully for Governor of Montana, after having lost the 2016 election to incumbent Democrat Steve Bullock.

As the Green Party was removed from the ballot, this was the first time since 1988 that there were no non-Republican or Democratic candidates running for either United States House of Representatives or United States Senate in Montana.

In the general election, Republican State Auditor Matt Rosendale defeated former state representative Kathleen Williams.

As of a result of the 2020 redistricting cycle, Montana regained its 2nd congressional district that it lost in 1993, therefore making the 2020 election the last election for the at-large district before it was eliminated.

Republican primary

Candidates

Nominee
Matt Rosendale, Montana State Auditor, nominee for the U.S. Senate in 2018, candidate for Montana's at-large congressional district in 2014

Eliminated in primary
Joe Dooling, rancher and chair of the Lewis and Clark County Republican Party
John Evankovich, electrical contractor
Debra Lamm, former chair of the Montana Republican Party and former state representative
Mark McGinley, youth counselor and retired Montana National Guard veteran
Corey Stapleton, Secretary of State of Montana, former state senator, candidate for Governor of Montana in 2012, candidate for the U.S. House in 2014

Declined
Greg Gianforte, incumbent U.S. Representative (running for governor)
Albert Olszewski, state senator (running for governor)
Denny Rehberg, former U.S. Representative, nominee for U.S. Senate in 1996 and 2012, and former Lieutenant Governor of Montana

Endorsements

Polling
Polls with a sample size of <100 have their sample size entries marked in red to indicate a lack of reliability.

Results

Democratic primary

Candidates

Nominee
Kathleen Williams, former state representative and nominee for Montana's at-large congressional district in 2018

Eliminated in primary
Tom Winter, state representative

Withdrew
Matt Rains, rancher and army veteran (endorsed Williams)

Declined
Wilmot Collins, mayor of Helena and former 2020 candidate for U.S. Senate
Rob Quist, musician, member of the Montana Arts Council, nominee for Montana's at-large congressional district in 2017

Endorsements

Polling
Polls with a sample size of <100 have their sample size entries marked in red to indicate a lack of reliability.

Results

Other candidates

Green Party

Disqualified
John Gibney, anti-immigration activist

Results

General election

Predictions

Polling

University of Montana polls did not account for certain presumed withdrawals of major party candidates after their primaries in the following polls.

with Joe Dooling (R), John Evankovich (R), Timothy Johnson (R), Corey Stapleton (R) and Tom Winter (D)

with Joe Dooling (R), Timothy Johnson (R), Matt Rains (D), Corey Stapleton (R) and Tom Winter (D)

Results

Notes

Partisan clients

References

External links
 
 
  (State affiliate of the U.S. League of Women Voters)
 

Official campaign websites
 Matt Rosendale (R) for Congress
 Kathleen Williams (D) for Congress

2020
Montana
United States House of Representatives